Princess Charlotte was launched in 1814 at South Shields. She initially sailed as West Indiaman. Then between 1818 and 1819 she made a voyage to India and one to Ceylon, both under a license from the British East India Company (EIC). On her return in 1819, Princess Charlotte became a whaler in the northern whale fishery. She continued whale hunting until ice crushed her on 14 June 1856.

Career
Princess Charlotte first appeared in Register of Shipping (RS) in 1814 and in Lloyd's Register (LR) in 1815.

In 1813, the EIC had lost its monopoly on the trade between India and Britain. British ships were then free to sail to India or the Indian Ocean under a license from the EIC.

On 7 March 1818, Princess Charlotte, Leishman, master sailed from Deal for Bombay. She returned to Deal on 11 April 1818.

On 8 July 1818, Princess Charlotte, Rennoldson, master, sailed for Ceylon under a license from the EIC. On 5 April 1819, she was at the Cape of Good Hope, having come from Pointe de Galle. On 8 May, Princess Charlotte was at St Helena. On 1 August, she returned to Deal.

The registers continued to carry Princess Charlotte with unchanged data until 1825–1826 when they showed her master having changed to Adamson and her trade as Dundee.

However, in 1820, Princess Charlotte had become a whaler sailing to the Northern Whale Fishery (Greenland and Davis Strait) from Dundee. On 2 January 1820, she entered the graving dock at Dundee. 

The data below came primarily from Coltish:

During this period (1820–1842), a voyage yielded an average 12 fish (whales) and 118 tuns of whale oil. Thus each fish yielded an average 9.7 tuns of oil.

Princess Charlotte continued to whale for another dozen years.

Fate
In June 1856, Princess Charlotte was in Davis Strait having had reasonable success; she had gathered five whales, 75 tuns of whale oil, and 5 tons of whale bone. On 14 June, as she was sailing between two ice floes in Melville Bay the ice suddenly closed in on her and crushed her, sinking her. The crew were barely able to get on the ice before she sank, and lost everything. Other whalers, which were following, took on the crew: Captain Deuchars and 24 men went on Advice (of Dundee), eight men went on Chieftain (of Kirkaldy), eight men went on Truelove (of Hull), and seven men went on St Andrew (of Aberdeen).

Citations and references
Citations

References
 
 

1814 ships
Ships built on the River Tyne
Age of Sail merchant ships of England
Whaling ships
Maritime incidents in June 1856